Noi: Rivista d’arte futurista was an avant-garde magazine which adopted a futurist stance. It was published in Rome between 1917 and 1925. Its subtitle was Raccolta internazionale d’arte d’avanguardia (Italian: International collection of avant-garde art).

History and profile
Noi was first published in June 1917. It was headquartered in Rome. The magazine came out irregularly until 1923 when its frequency was redesigned as monthly. Its founders and directors were Italian painter Enrico Prampolini and Bino Sanminiatelli. It aimed at making the Italian culture more connected with the European culture. The magazine folded in 1925.

Some issues of Noi were archived by the Leibniz University Hannover.

References

External links
Digital archive of Noi

1917 establishments in Italy
1925 disestablishments in Italy
Avant-garde magazines
Italian-language magazines
Defunct magazines published in Italy
Magazines established in 1917
Magazines disestablished in 1925
Magazines published in Rome
Visual arts magazines published in Italy
Italian Futurism
Irregularly published magazines
Monthly magazines published in Italy